Michael J. Hanley (born December 9, 1955) is the current chairman of the Saginaw County Board of Commissioners and a former Democratic member of the Michigan House of Representatives.

Born in December 1955 in Saginaw, Hanley graduated from Arthur Hill High School in 1974. He received a degree in political science from Western Michigan University, graduating summa cum laude. Hanley worked for 17 years for General Motors' Saginaw Division. He was elected to Saginaw City Council in 1987 and was re-elected in 1991; he served as mayor pro tempore from 1991 to 1993. In 1994, Hanley was elected to the Michigan House of Representatives. Re-elected twice, he served as Democratic leader from 1999 to 2000.

Hanley was or is involved in numerous community organizations, including as a past chair of the Mayor's Housing Task Force, treasurer of the Solid Waste Management Authority, the East Central Michigan Planning and Development Region Board, and the Underground Railroad Shelter for Battered Women and Children.

Hanley was elected to the Saginaw County Board of Commissioners in 2008, and became chairman of the board in 2013.

References

1955 births
Living people
Politicians from Saginaw, Michigan
Western Michigan University alumni
County commissioners in Michigan
Michigan city council members
Democratic Party members of the Michigan House of Representatives
20th-century American politicians
21st-century American politicians